The Hindu is an Indian English-language daily newspaper owned by The Hindu Group, headquartered in Chennai, Tamil Nadu. It began as a weekly in 1878 and became a daily in 1889. It is one of the Indian newspapers of record and the second most circulated English-language newspaper in India, after The Times of India. , The Hindu is published from 21 locations across 11 states of India.

The Hindu has been a family-owned newspaper since 1905, when it was purchased by S. Kasturi Ranga Iyengar from the original founders. It is now jointly owned by Iyengar's descendants, referred to as the "Kasturi family", who serve as the directors of the holding company. The current chairperson of the group is Malini Parthasarathy, a great-granddaughter of Iyengar.
Except for a period of about two years, when S. Varadarajan held the editorship of the newspaper, the editorial positions of the paper were always held by members of the family or held under their direction.

History

Early years 
The Hindu was founded in Madras on 20 September 1878 as a weekly newspaper, by what was known then as the Triplicane Six consisting of four law students and two teachers:- T. T. Rangacharya, P. V. Rangacharya, D. Kesava Rao Pantulu and N. Subba Rao Pantulu, led by G. Subramania Iyer (a school teacher from Tanjore district) and M. Veeraraghavacharyar, a lecturer at Pachaiyappa's College. Started in order to support the campaign of Sir T. Muthuswamy Iyer for a judgeship at the Madras High Court and to counter the campaign against him carried out by the Anglo-Indian press, The Hindu was one of the newspapers of the period established to protest the policies of the British Raj. About 100 copies of the inaugural issue were printed at Srinidhi Press, Georgetown, on one rupee and twelve annas of borrowed money. Subramania Iyer became the first editor and Veera Raghavacharya, the first managing director of the newspaper.

The paper was initially printed from Srinidhi Press but later moved to Scottish Press, then to The Hindu Press, Mylapore. Started as a weekly newspaper, the paper became a tri-weekly in 1883 and an evening daily in 1889. A single copy of the newspaper was priced at four annas. The offices moved to rented premises at 100 Mount Road on 3 December 1883. The newspaper started printing at its own press there, named "The National Press," which was established on borrowed capital as public subscriptions were not forthcoming. The building itself became The Hindus in 1892, after the Maharaja of Vizianagaram, Pusapati Ananda Gajapati Raju, gave The National Press a loan both for the building and to carry out needed expansion.

'Its editorial stances have earned it the nickname, the 'Maha Vishnu of Mount Road'. "From the new address, 100 Mount Road, which was to remain The Hindu's home till 1939, there issued a quarto-size paper with a front-page full of advertisements—a practice that came to an end only in 1958 when it followed the lead of its idol, the pre-Thomson Times [London]—and three back pages also at the service of the advertiser. In between, there were more views than news." After 1887, when the annual session of Indian National Congress was held in Madras, the paper's coverage of national news increased significantly, and led to the paper becoming an evening daily starting 1 April 1889.

Kasturi family 
The partnership between Veeraraghavachariar and Subramania Iyer was dissolved in October 1898. Iyer quit the paper and Veeraraghavachariar became the sole owner and appointed C. Karunakara Menon the editor. However, The Hindus adventurousness began to decline in the 1900s and so did its circulation, which was down to 800 copies when the sole proprietor decided to sell out. The purchaser was The Hindus Legal Adviser from 1895, S. Kasturi Ranga Iyengar, a politically ambitious lawyer who had migrated from a Kumbakonam village to practise in Coimbatore and from thence to Madras. Iyengar's son, Kasturi Srinivasan, became managing editor of The Hindu upon his father's death in 1923 and Chief Editor in February 1934. The  Kasturi family, descendants of Kasturi Ranga Iyengar,  have since  owned and, through most of the paper's life, held the top editorial positions in the company.

Joint managing director N. Murali said in July 2003, "It is true that our readers have been complaining that some of our reports are partial and lack objectivity. But it also depends on reader beliefs." N. Ram was appointed on 27 June 2003 as its editor-in-chief with a mandate to "improve the structures and other mechanisms to uphold and strengthen quality and objectivity in news reports and opinion pieces", authorised to "restructure the editorial framework and functions in line with the competitive environment". On 3 and 23 September 2003, the reader's letters column carried responses from readers saying the editorial was biased. An editorial in August 2003 observed that the newspaper was affected by the 'editorialising as news reporting' virus, and expressed a determination to buck the trend, restore the professionally sound lines of demarcation, and strengthen objectivity and factuality in its coverage.

In 1987–88, The Hindus coverage of the Bofors arms deal scandal, a series of document-backed exclusives, set the terms of the national political discourse on this subject. The Bofors scandal broke in April 1987 with Swedish Radio alleging that bribes had been paid to top Indian political leaders, officials and Army officers in return for the Swedish arms manufacturing company winning a hefty contract with the Government of India for the purchase of 155 mm howitzers. During a six-month period, the newspaper published scores of copies of original papers that documented the secret payments, amounting to $50 million, into Swiss bank accounts, the agreements behind the payments, communications relating to the payments and the crisis response, and other material. The investigation was led by a part-time correspondent of The Hindu, Chitra Subramaniam, reporting from Geneva, and was supported by Ram in Chennai. The scandal was a major embarrassment to the party in power at the centre, the Indian National Congress, and its leader Prime Minister Rajiv Gandhi. The paper's editorial accused the Prime Minister of being party to massive fraud and cover-up.

In 1991, Deputy Editor N. Ravi, Ram's younger brother, replaced G. Kasturi as editor. Nirmala Lakshman, Kasturi Srinivasan's granddaughter and the first woman in the company to hold an editorial or managerial role, became Joint Editor of The Hindu and her sister, Malini Parthasarathy, Executive Editor.

In 2003, the Jayalalitha government of the state of Tamil Nadu, of which Chennai is the capital, filed cases against The Hindu for breach of privilege of the state legislative body. The move was perceived as a government's assault on freedom of the press. The paper garnered support from the journalistic community.

In 2010, The Indian Express reported a dispute within the publisher of The Hindu regarding the retirement age of the person working as the editor-in-chief, a post which was then being served by N. Ram. Following this report, Ram decided to sue The Indian Express for defamation, a charge which the Indian Express denied. N. Ravi and Malini Parthasarathy voiced concern about Ram's decision, saying that doing so goes against The Hindu’s values and that journalists shouldn’t fear “scrutiny”, respectively. During subsequent events, Parthasarathy tweeted that “issues relating to management of newspaper have come to the surface, including editorial direction” in her response to a question. Later, Parthasarathy called N. Ram and other The Hindu employees “Stalinists”, alleging that they were trying to oust her from the newspaper.

In 2011, during the resignation of N. Ram, the newspaper became the subject of a succession battle between the members of the Kasturi family. Ram had appointed Siddharth Varadarajan as his successor as the editor-in-chief of the newspaper who justified the appointment on the ostensible basis of separation of ownership and management, which was opposed by N. Ravi as it deviated from the publication's tradition of family members retaining editorial control over it. Varadarajan was subsequently accused by the dissident family members of being left leaning and the matter of Varadarajan's appointment was brought in front of the board of directors of the parent company, Kasturi & Sons. During the dispute, Narasimhan Murali alleged that N. Ram ran The Hindu “like a banana republic, with cronyism and vested interests ruling the roost”. In the end the board voted 6–6 over a review of the appointment, the tie was broken by a deciding vote from Ram in his capacity as the chairman of the company and in favor of his decision.

On 2 April 2013 The Hindu started "The Hindu in School" with S. Shivakumar as editor. This is a new edition for young readers, to be distributed through schools as part of The Hindu'''s "Newspaper in Education" programme. It covers the day's important news developments, features, sports, and regional news. On 16 September 2013, The Hindu group launched its Tamil edition with K. Ashokan as editor.

On 21 October 2013, changes were made in Editorial as well as business of The Hindu. N. Ravi took over as Editor-in-chief of The Hindu and Malini Parthasarathy as Editor of The Hindu. As a consequence, Siddarth Varadarajan submitted his resignation. N. Ram became Chairman of Kasturi & Sons Limited and Publisher of The Hindu and Group publications; and N. Murali, Co-chairman of the company.

During the 2015 South Indian floods, for the first time since its founding in 1878, the newspaper did not publish a print edition in Chennai market on 2 December, as workers were unable to reach the press building.

On 5 January 2016, Malini Parthasarathy, the Editor of the newspaper, resigned with immediate effect. It was reported by the media that she resigned her post, citing "general dissatisfaction" with her performance. However, she continues to be a Wholetime Director of Kasturi & Sons Ltd.

Management
Over the course of its history, the Kasturi Ranga Iyengar family has usually run The Hindu through the presence of family in editorial and business operations as well as on the Board. It was headed by G. Kasturi from 1965 to 1991, N. Ravi from 1991 to 2003, and by his brother, N. Ram, from 27 June 2003 to 18 January 2011.

As of 2010, there are 12 directors in the board of Kasturi & Sons.

Managing directors

M. Veeraraghavachariar (1878–1904)
S. Kasturi Ranga Iyengar (1904–1923)
K. Srinivasan (1923–1959)
G. Narasimhan (1959–1977)
N. Ram (1977–2011)
K. Balaji (2011–2012)
Rajiv C. Lochan (2013- 2019)
 L. V. Navaneeth (2019–present)

Editors

G. Subramania Iyer (1878–1898)
C. Karunakara Menon (1898–1905)
S. Kasturi Ranga Iyengar (1905–1923)
S. Rangaswami Iyengar (1923–1926)
K. Srinivasan (1926–1928)
A. Rangaswami Iyengar (1928–1934)
K. Srinivasan (1934–1959)
S. Parthasarathy (1959–1965)
G. Kasturi (1965–1991)
N. Ravi (1991–2003)
N. Ram (2003–2012)
Siddharth Varadarajan (2012–2013)
N. Ravi (2013–2015)
Malini Parthasarathy (2015–2016)
Mukund Padmanabhan (2016–2019)
Suresh Nambath (2019–present)

Online presenceThe Hindu was the first newspaper in India to have a website, launched in 1995.

On 15 August 2009, the 130-year-old newspaper launched the beta version of its redesigned website at beta.thehindu.com. This was the first redesign of its website since its launch. On 24 June 2010 the beta version of the website went fully live at www.thehindu.co.in.

On 15 August 2022, for the first time in its 144-year-old history, The Hindu started publishing Hindi-translated editorials on its website.

Editorial policy and reputation

In 1965, The Times listed The Hindu as one of the world's ten best newspapers. Discussing each of its choices in separate articles, The Times wrote: "The Hindu takes the general seriousness to lengths of severity... published in Madras, it is the only newspaper which in spite of being published only in a provincial capital is regularly and attentively read in Delhi. It is read not only as a distant and authoritative voice on national affairs but as an expression of the most liberal—and least provincial—southern attitudes... Its Delhi Bureau gives it outstanding political and economic dispatches and it carries regular and frequent reports from all state capitals, so giving more news from states, other than its own, than most newspapers in India... It might fairly be described as a national voice with a southern accent. The Hindu can claim to be the most respected paper in India."

In 1968, the American Newspaper Publishers Association awarded The Hindu its World Press Achievement Award. An extract from the citation reads:
"Throughout nearly a century of its publication The Hindu has exerted wide influence not only in Madras but throughout India. Conservative in both tone and appearance, it has wide appeal to the English-speaking segment of the population and wide readership among government officials and business leaders... The Hindu has provided its readers a broad and balanced news coverage, enterprising reporting and a sober and thoughtful comment... It has provided its country a model of journalistic excellence... It has fought for a greater measure of humanity for India and its people... and has not confined itself to a narrow chauvinism. Its Correspondents stationed in the major capitals of the world furnish The Hindu with world-wide news coverage... For its championing of reason over emotion, for its dedication to principle even in the face of criticism and popular disapproval, for its confidence in the future, it has earned the respect of its community, its country, and the world."

In 2012, The Hindu became the only Indian newspaper to appoint a Readers Editor, an independent internal news ombudsman.

A 2014 article in the Indian Journal of Pharmacology praised The Hindus ongoing journalism and critique of clinical trials in India.

On October 7, 2019, The Hindu announced that "Two editorial meetings a month will be opened up to readers in order to expand conversations and build trust", a first in India's media industry.

The newspaper currently has foreign bureaus in eleven locations – Islamabad, Colombo, Dhaka, Kathmandu, Beijing, Moscow, Paris, Dubai, Washington, D.C., London, and most recently Addis Ababa.

 See also 

The Hindu Business Line
Frontline magazine
The Hindu Group
List of newspapers in India
List of newspapers in India by readership
The Hindu Literary Prize
Lit for Life
Sportstar

References

Sources
 

Further reading
 Merrill, John C. and Harold A. Fisher. The world's great dailies: profiles of fifty newspapers (1980) pp 162–69
 
 
 Looking Back: The history of The Hindu'' as told by historian S. Muthiah.

External links

    
 

1878 establishments in India
Asian news websites
English-language newspapers published in India
Mass media in Chennai
National newspapers published in India
Newspapers published in Chennai
Daily newspapers published in India
Newspapers published in Kolkata
Publications established in 1878
The Hindu Group
Newspapers published in Coimbatore
Newspapers published in Tiruchirappalli
Newspapers published in Patna
Newspapers published in Bangalore
Newspapers published in Vijayawada